Gary Smith was an American retired Army veteran and political candidate known for challenging incumbent Janice Arnold-Jones for the Republican ticket in the 2012 U.S. House election to represent the 1st Congressional District of New Mexico. He was disqualified from the ballot, after which he was convicted of stalking and harassing Arnold-Jones and other politicians.

2012 election
In late 2011, Smith announced his intention to represent the 1st Congressional District of New Mexico in the 2012 elections. To do so, he would have needed to oust incumbent Arnold-Jones in winning the Republican ticket, then win the popular vote after gaining the GOP nomination. His campaign was managed by Rhead Story, another local Republican politician. Smith's announcement said: 
At the Republican pre-primary convention on March 17, 2012, incumbent Arnold-Jones was challenged by then Albuquerque City Councilman Dan Lewis and Smith. Arnold-Jones took 62% of the vote, with Lewis following at 33% and Smith garnering 4%. The Washington Post stated Smith "wasn't even close to defeating" Arnold-Jones.
 
A complaint was raised by Arnold-Jones that stated some of Smith's nomination petition signatures were invalid. Smith would have had to have gathered 1,579 signatures to qualify for the Republican nomination ballot. Responding to the complaint, Judge C. Shannon Bacon ruled that some of the signatures were indeed invalid, thus disqualifying Smith from the race. Of the 1,823 Smith gathered, 492 were deemed invalid, meaning he needed 248 more signatures. Signatures can be considered invalid if "signers either were duplicates from other petitions, registered in another district or not registered as Republicans."

With Lewis withdrawing from the race and Smith being disqualified, Arnold-Jones was granted the GOP ticket by default. Eventually, Arnold-Jones lost the seat to Democrat Michelle Lujan Grisham in the popular election. Arnold-Jones was defeated ~59% to ~41%.

In total, Smith spent nearly $300,000 on his congressional campaign, with most of that amount being his personal funds. The exact amount came to $296,951.

Post-disqualification crimes
Following Smith's disqualification, Arnold-Jones had her tires either slashed or stabbed 19 times by early December. She installed a surveillance system at her house, which caught Smith slashing her tires again. Smith was arrested twice for stalking Arnold-Jones at her residence, as well as for the vandalism. He was convicted of aggravated stalking and misdemeanor stalking in 2014 and sentenced to 30 months in prison with 17 months credit for time served.

Personal life
Gary Smith was the son of Claire and LaVerne E. Smith (née Grapp) from Albuquerque, New Mexico. Smith served in the Army as an intelligence officer for more than 20 years before being honorably discharged. He retired from the military in 1991 as a Sergeant first class.

Smith's mother LaVerne died January 19, 2014, at the age of 87. Gary had died by the time his father Claire died on May 15, 2022; Gary was listed as deceased in Claire's obituary in the Albuquerque Journal.

See also
United States House of Representatives elections in New Mexico, 2012

References

Politicians from Albuquerque, New Mexico
New Mexico Republicans